In public utility regulation, decoupling refers to the disassociation of a utility's profits from its sales of the energy commodity.  Instead, a rate of return is aligned with meeting revenue targets, and rates are adjusted up or down to meet the target at the end of the adjustment period.  This makes the utility indifferent to selling less product and improves the ability of energy efficiency and distributed generation to operate within the utility environment.

Ideally, utilities should be rewarded based on how well they meet their customers' energy service needs. However, most current rate designs place the focus on commodity sales instead, tying a distribution company's recovery of fixed costs directly to its commodity sales.

In order to motivate utilities to consider all the options when planning and making resource decisions on how to meet their customers' needs, the sales-revenue link in current rate design must be broken. Breaking that link between the utility's commodity sales and revenues, removes both the incentive to increase electricity sales and the disincentive to run effective energy efficiency programs or invest in other activities that may reduce load. Decision-making then refocuses on making least-cost investments to deliver reliable energy services to customers even when such investments reduce throughput. The result is a better alignment of shareholder and customer interests to provide for more economically and environmentally efficient resource decisions.

As an added benefit, breaking the sales-revenue link streamlines the regulatory process for rate adjustments. Contention over sales forecasts consumes extensive time in every rate case. If the sales-revenue link is broken, these forecasts carry no economic weight, so the incentive to game forecasts of electricity sales is removed and rate cases become less adversarial.

While many environmentalists and conservation advocates support decoupling, many consumer advocates representing utility ratepayers have opposed decoupling as it attempts to guarantee revenue levels to utility companies.  Decoupling mechanisms reduce a utility company's financial risk from reducing sales, due to conservation, weather and economic conditions.  As a result, many consumer advocates have requested and state and federal regulators have required that utility companies profit levels (measured through a return on equity allowance) be reduced to reflect lower risk.

Decoupling plus
Decoupling plus is an economics term for the decoupling of higher profits for energy producers from higher energy use. Through government regulation, the energy producer makes a higher profit when energy conservation targets are met.

See also 
 De-linkage, a proposed model for development of new pharmaceutical drugs where the profitability of a drug is isolated from its volume of sales
Resource productivity
Sustainability accounting

References 

Public utilities